The Endeavor Weekly (also spelled Endeavour Weekly), or Effort Weekly, Working Hard Weekly, was a Beijing-based influential liberal magazine, founded on May 7, 1922, and finalized on October 31, 1923, with a total of 75 issues. The magazine was published by the Shanghai Commercial Press and was distinctly political.

On May 7, 1922, Hu Shih composed Song of Endeavor, which was the inaugural words of Endeavor Weekly.

In September 1922, Hu Shih published an article entitled Self-Government in the Federated Provinces and Warlord Partition in Endeavor Weekly, distinguishing the constructive self-government movement from the destructive warlordism and proposing the program of building "the federation of provincial self-governments".

References

1922 establishments in China
1923 disestablishments in China
Defunct magazines published in China
Defunct political magazines
Liberalism in China
Magazines established in 1922
Magazines disestablished in 1923
Magazines published in Beijing
Political magazines published in China